Playa Del Rock is the third studio album by American hard rock band London, released on December 19, 1990, by Noise Records. Some versions of this album was released under the band name D'Priest. Studio recording included appearances by Jimmy Greenspoon of Three Dog Night, Guy Babylon of Elton John as well as Richard Podolor, a/k/a Richie Allen on Mandolin.

"Hot Child in the City" is a Nick Gilder cover.

Track listing 
 "Ride You Through the Night" - 4:23
 "Russian Winter" - 3:09
 "It's So Easy" - 5:06
 "Miss You" - 6:17
 "Money Honey" - 3:33
 "Love Games" - 4:01
 "Heart Beat (It's All Right)" - 4:26
 "Hot Child in the City" - 3:26
 "The Wall" - 5:26
 "Been Around Before" - 3:41

Personnel
Band members
Nadir D'Priest - vocals
Sean Lewis - guitar
Brian West - bass
Alan Krigger - drums
Vincent Gilbert - Keyboards

Additional musicians
Guy Babylon, Jimmy Greenspoon - keyboards
Richie Allen (> producer) - mandolin

Production
Richard Podolor - producer
Bill Cooper - engineer

References

1990 albums
London (heavy metal band) albums
Albums produced by Richard Podolor
Noise Records albums